Utricularia perversa is a medium-sized suspended aquatic carnivorous plant that belongs to the genus Utricularia. It is probably most closely related to U. radiata. U. perversa is endemic to the Mexican states of Chihuahua and Guanajuato.

See also 
 List of Utricularia species

References 

Carnivorous plants of North America
Flora of Chihuahua (state)
Flora of Guanajuato
perversa